Statistics of JSL Cup in the 1976 season.

Overview
It was contested by 20 teams, and Hitachi won the championship.

Results

East-A

East-B

West-A

West-B

Quarterfinals
Mitsubishi Motors 2-0 Honda
Eidai 2-1 Fujita Industries
Hitachi 2-1 Toyota Motors
Toyo Industries 1-3 Furukawa Electric

Semifinals
Mitsubishi Motors 0-1 Eidai
Hitachi 1-1 (PK 2–0) Furukawa Electric

Final
Eidai 0-1 Hitachi
Hitachi won the championship

References
 

JSL Cup
League Cup